FaktorTel Pty Ltd. is an Australian-based communications company that uses its VoIP network to deliver phone service to business and wholesale customers. FaktorTel is a wholly owned subsidiary of Over the Wire Holdings Limited (ASX:OTW), and operates a purpose built VOIP network spanning Australia and New Zealand.

FaktorTel was founded in Queensland, Australia in April 2004 by Christopher and Allan Cowling and received an Australian government grant for providing VoIP throughout Regional and Rural Australia.

In December 2015 FaktorTel was acquired by the public company Over the Wire Holdings Ltd and now operates under the Over the Wire umbrella of companies, (ASX:OTW).

Government grant 

In June 2005 FaktorTel was the receiver of a government grant for the provisioning of VOIP services throughout regional and rural Australia. The grant was part of the Australian Government's COMET initiative (Commercialising Emerging Technologies) and was for a total of $60,000 AUD. The Grant concluded in June 2007 with full Australian broadband access to the FaktorTel VOIP network.

References

External links
 
 AusIndustry.gov: Australian Government Grant for FaktorTel Pty. Ltd
 vspPanel website

Telecommunications companies of Australia
VoIP companies
Telecommunications companies established in 2005
Australian companies established in 2005